Kōbō Kenichi (born as Kenichi Mineyama; August 18, 1973 – July 2, 2021) was a Japanese sumo wrestler. His highest rank was maegashira 9.

Career
Kōbō made his professional debut in March 1989 at the age of 15. He worked his way quickly through the lowest three divisions, making his makushita debut shortly after his 18th birthday, less than three years into his career. However, he was unable to advance further for several years, reaching sekitori status only in January 1999 upon promotion to the second highest jūryō division, after nearly ten years of toiling in the lower divisions.

He reached the top makuuchi division for the first time in November 2001 but only lasted two tournaments before being demoted. He returned on two other occasions but he largely remained a veteran of the jūryō division, in which he spent 44 tournaments. For a long period he was the highest ranking wrestler in Miyagino stable, before the emergence of Hakuho, now a yokozuna. In July 2007, he fell to the unsalaried makushita division for the first time since September 2000, and he announced his retirement in December of that year.

Retirement from sumo and death
Kōbō remained with the Japan Sumo Association as an elder under the name Ajigawa-oyakata, and initially worked as a coach at his old stable. In May 2008, he had his danpatsu-shiki, or official retirement ceremony, at the Ryogoku Kokugikan. In February 2010 he admitted that, against the wishes of the Tatsunami ichimon, he voted for independent candidate Takanohana instead of the approved candidate Ōshima in the elections to the Sumo Association's board. He offered his resignation, but was persuaded to stay. Following the controversy he moved to the Takanohana stable where he coached under the name Nishiiwa-oyakata, which was owned by the active wrestler Wakanosato. In July 2015, with Wakanosato likely to retire, he switched to the Otowayama name formerly owned by the late Takanonami and subsequently controlled by Takanohana Oyakata. He left the Sumo Association in January 2018 after the Otowayama kabu was needed by ex-maegashira Daido (formerly Onogawa Oyakata).

Kōbō died from COVID-19 on July 2, 2021, at the age of 47.

Fighting style
Kōbō's favoured kimarite or techniques were hidari-yotsu (a right hand outside, left hand inside grip on the opponent's mawashi), shitatenage (underarm throw), and yorikiri (force out).

Career record

See also
Glossary of sumo terms
List of past sumo wrestlers
List of sumo elders

References

External links
 

1973 births
2021 deaths
Japanese sumo wrestlers
Sumo people from Kagoshima Prefecture
Deaths from the COVID-19 pandemic in Japan